The Sweet Sweet Fantasy Tour was the ninth concert tour by American singer-songwriter Mariah Carey.  The tour was featured prominently in the singer's docu-series Mariah's World.

The tour kicked off with a show at The SSE Hydro in Glasgow, Scotland on March 15, 2016 and concluded with a show at the Neal S. Blaisdell Center in Honolulu, Hawaii on November 26, 2016. The tour saw Carey play six venues across Great Britain and various others across Europe, as well as several dates in Africa. The Sweet Sweet Fantasy Tour is Carey's first tour to visit the European region in 13 years, the last being the Charmbracelet World Tour in 2003. It is also her first tour to visit Hawaii in almost two decades.

The tour's set list was noted by fans for including songs rarely or never before performed by Carey, such as "Loverboy", "Against All Odds (Take a Look at Me Now)" and "When You Believe".

Set list 

 "Fantasy" (contains elements of the Def Club Mix and Bad Boy Fantasy remix)
 "Emotions"
 "My All" 
 "Always Be My Baby"
 "I'll Be There" 
 "Rock With You" 
 "Touch My Body"
 "I Know What You Want" / "Obsessed" / "It's Like That" / "Shake It Off" / "Loverboy"
 "Heartbreaker" (Desert Storm Remix)
 "Against All Odds (Take a Look at Me Now)"
 "One Sweet Day" 
 "When You Believe"
 "Hero"
 "We Belong Together"
 "Without You"
 "Butterfly Reprise"

Shows

Cancelled shows

Personnel 
James "Big Jim" Wright – musical director
Daniel Moore II - keyboards
Derrieuz Edgecombe – keyboards
Lance Tolbert - bass
Joshua Baker – drums
Trey Lorenz – background vocals
Mary Ann Tatum – background vocals
Takeytha Johnson – background vocals

Source:

References

2016 concert tours
Mariah Carey concert tours